Alex Frame (born 18 June 1993) is a New Zealand racing cyclist, who last rode for New Zealand amateur team Mike Greer Homes–Circuit Asphalt. He rode at the 2015 UCI Track Cycling World Championships, winning gold in the team pursuit.

Major results

2011
 UCI Junior Track Cycling World Championships
3rd  Points race
3rd  Team pursuit
2013
 National Road Championships
3rd Under-23 road race
5th Time trial
 6th Overall Boucle de l'Artois
 9th Overall New Zealand Cycle Classic
2014
 8th Velothon Berlin
2015
 1st  Team pursuit, UCI Track World Championships
 National Track Championships
1st  Scratch
2nd Individual pursuit
 8th Overall Rás Tailteann
2016
 1st  Scratch, National Track Championships
 1st Stage 7 Tour of Southland
2017
 New Zealand Cycle Classic
1st Stages 3 & 5
 1st Stage 2 Tour du Loir-et-Cher
 Istrian Spring Trophy
1st Prologue & Stage 3
 3rd Trofej Umag
 5th Poreč Trophy

References

External links

1993 births
Living people
New Zealand male cyclists
Cyclists from Christchurch